Sloan's Lake, also known as Sloan Lake and Sloans Lake, is a body of water, park, and neighborhood in Denver, Colorado, US. The neighborhood is located on the northwest side of Denver. The lake is the central feature of Sloan's Lake Park, which is managed by the Parks and Recreation division of the City and County of Denver.

Sloan's Lake
Sloan's Lake is located on the western edge of Denver's city limits, adjacent to the suburbs of Lakewood, Edgewater and Wheat Ridge. The approximate boundaries are Sheridan Boulevard to the west, 17th Avenue to the south, Raleigh St. to the east, and 26th Avenue to the north.  There are no tributary streams to the lake.

History

The true history of the creation of Sloan Lake may never be officially known, but during the settlement of the Denver area in the mid to late 19th century, the lake did not exist.  Since spring 1859, South Golden Road connecting Denver and the western suburb of Golden crossed through where Sloan Lake is now.

In December 1866, under the newly enacted Southern Homestead Act, Thomas M. Sloan received a patent for the land from US President Andrew Johnson to use the land for agricultural purposes, farming, and cattle-raising. A commonly accepted and incorrect legend states that Sloan dug a well on the land, inadvertently tapping into an underground aquifer, and that when he awoke the next morning, part of his farm land was covered in water. That flooded this part of South Golden Road, and the realigned thoroughfare, now known as Colfax Avenue would become the major east-west thoroughfare in this part of the city. But, according to gold rush era stagecoach driver Bill Turner, the lake appeared sometime between when he left for Kansas in June 1861 and when he returned in early 1863. It is possible that Sloan occupied the land prior to patenting it. However, its unlikely Sloan would have applied for a patent to farm land that was under water and just as unlikely that the patent would have been granted under the Southern Homestead Act.

The lake once exceeded  and extended north and west beyond its current size, but portions were filled north of 25th Avenue and west of Sheridan Boulevard. 
The area surrounding the lake was once home to an amusement park and swimming facility known as Manhattan Beach. Opened to the public 27 June 1881, it was the first amusement park to be built west of the Mississippi River (it burned down in 1908 and was rebuilt as Luna Park later that year); mishaps, and competition from other such attractions in the vicinity (Elitch Gardens and Lakeside Amusement Park), led to its closure in 1914. Cooper Lake, a separate body of water just southeast of Sloan's Lake, fell under the jurisdiction of the federal Works Projects Administration in the 1930s, and a plan was developed which involved building channels beneath the surface of the water on both lakes. This essentially created one body of water that has commonly become known as Sloan's Lake.

Wildlife and Habitat 
Sloan's Lake is a seasonal and year-round home to a variety of birds, fish and other wildlife.  Birds include white pelicans, mallard ducks, Canada geese, seagulls, barn swallows, house finches, and common night hawks.  Cormorants and herons find refuge from shore-based predators in colonies on Cooper Island and feed on black crappie, carp and trout stocked by Colorado Parks and Wildlife agency.  The lake’s muddy flats and shallower waters provide habitat for wading birds such as avocets and semi-aquatic rodents including native muskrats and non-native nutria.  Predators include fox and coyote, which are occasionally seen around the lake.   Cottonwood trees, cattails and bluegrass grow along the shoreline, and the lake waters support duckweed, algae and other native and invasive aquatic plants.

Penny Island 

Found in the center of the lake, Penny Island is a mostly barren 67,396 square foot island. It houses a manmade osprey nesting structure constructed in 2014. The island is a common attraction for local amateur drone pilots.

Sloan's Lake Park

At , Sloan's Lake Park is the second largest park in Denver (after City Park). Typical activities at the park include hiking, jogging and bicycling on the trails and sidewalks that surround the lake, and fishing and boating on the lake itself. There are basketball and tennis courts located in the park. An annual event known as the Dragon Boat Festival attracts thousands of visitors each summer, celebrating Asian American culture and civilization.

Sloan's Lake neighborhood
The neighborhood of Sloan's Lake has undergone rapid gentrification in recent years, with a corresponding appreciation in real estate values: the average price for a single family home in 2017 was $543,400, compared to the 2009 average of $259,000. According to the 2000 census, the average household income was $48,300; as of 2017, it is $66,618. The Average Price per Square foot for a home in June, 2017 was $311.16. The housing stock in Sloan's Lake is diverse with a wide range of housing and styles including 1920s brick bungalows to new, post-modern architecture. More than 66 percent of Sloan's Lake residents own their home, an above average figure for Denver.

A construction boom has also characterized the Sloan's Lake neighborhood in recent years, with a flurry of both single family homes and apartment units being built. The closure of St. Anthony's Hospital, which encompassed a seven-block radius to the south of the park, has allowed for an ambitious residential redevelopment that will include a 12-story condominium tower, a 369 unit apartment building, and a bevy of restaurants and shops.

References

External links
Denver Parks information at denvergov.org

Bodies of water of Denver
Lakes of Colorado
Neighborhoods in Denver
Parks in Denver